The Tooting Bec Cup is a trophy currently awarded by the Professional Golfers' Association of Great Britain and Ireland to the association member born in, or with a parent or parents born in, the United Kingdom or Republic of Ireland who returns the lowest single-round score in The Open Championship.

Inaugurated in 1901 the Tooting Bec Challenge Cup was originally a separate competition. From 1910 it was awarded to the winner of a southern section qualifying competition for a major tournament and then since 1924 it has been awarded to the best round in The Open Championship by a British or Irish member of the PGA. It is the PGA's oldest trophy, predating the northern section's Leeds Cup which was first contested in 1902.

History
The Tooting Bec Challenge Cup was originally a 36-hole stroke play tournament organised by the London and Counties Professional Golfers' Association, the forerunner of the Professional Golfers' Association. The tournament was held on 15 October 1901 at the Tooting Bec Golf Club, Furzedown and the cup was donated by the Tooting Bec club. Of the 50 members who entered 46 played. J.H. Taylor won the event and was presented with the cup by the club captain, Norman Bailey. With the formation of the PGA in late 1901, the cup became an event organised by the southern section of the PGA.

Since 1924, it has not been a standalone tournament, and the trophy has been awarded to the PGA member from the United Kingdom or Republic of Ireland who records the lowest single-round score in the Open. The precise qualification rule has varied. Henry Cotton did not receive it in 1934, despite his rounds of 65 and 67, because at the time the award went "to the member of P.G.A. living in Great Britain who accomplishes the best single round during the championship" and Cotton was then living in Belgium.

Winners

Tournament winners
This table gives details of the tournament winners from 1901 to 1923. From 1910 the cup was awarded to the winner of a qualifying competition for a major tournament.

In 1904 the PGA experimented with handicaps and John McLaren, a new professional, was one of six professionals to receive strokes. Vardon won the playoff, played the same evening, scoring 76 to McLaren's 81−3=78. The 1908 playoff was also played in the evening after the tournament.

The 1910 event was planned for 11 May at Banstead Downs but was cancelled because of the death of Edward VII. The cup was awarded to the winner of the southern section qualifying competition for the News of the World Match Play.

In 1911 it was to be awarded to the winner of the southern section qualifying competition for the Sphere and Tatler Foursomes Tournament. Vardon and Reid tied in the qualifying event and had a playoff two days later to determine the winner of the cup. Vardon won with a score of 76 to Reid's 78.

Because of congestion during the 1911 qualifying, the 1912 southern section qualifying competition for the Sphere and Tatler tournament was played on two courses. Half played at West Herts Golf Club and half at Purley Downs Golf Club. Phil Gaudin and James Braid led their respective events, both scoring 147, and a playoff between them would determine the winner of the cup. The playoff did not take place for nearly a year, being played on 31 March 1913 at Royal Mid-Surrey Golf Club. Gaudin scored 76 to Braid's 81.

The same system was used in 1913. Half played at Fulwell Golf Club and half at Denham Golf Club. At Fulwell, Rowland Jones and Ted Ray tied on 145 while at Denham, James Batley and Harry Vardon led on 152. A playoff between the four players would determine the winner of the cup. As in 1912, the playoff did not take place for nearly a year, being played on 14 April 1914 at Thorpe Hall Golf Club. 18 holes were played and resulted in another tie. Batley and Ray scoring 74, with Jones on 77 and Vardon on 78. There was then a further playoff on 20 April 1914 at Old Fold Manor Golf Club. Again 18 holes were played, Ray winning with a score of 74 to Batley's 76.

In 1920, 1921 and 1923 the trophy was awarded to the winner of the southern section qualifying competition for the Daily Mail Tournament.

References

The Open Championship
Golf tournaments in England